Vauvenargues may refer to:

People
 Luc de Clapiers, marquis de Vauvenargues (1715–1747), French writer

Places
 Château of Vauvenargues, the family home of Luc de Clapiers, in the village of Vauvenargues
 Vauvenargues, Bouches-du-Rhône, a commune in southern France